Amaya is a census-designated place (CDP) in Zavala County, Texas, United States. This was a new CDP formed from parts of the former Las Colonias CDP prior to the 2010 census with a population of 93.

Geography
Amaya is located at  (28.713886, -99.835838).

References

Census-designated places in Zavala County, Texas
Census-designated places in Texas